Accident is a 1967 British drama film directed by Joseph Losey. Written by Harold Pinter, it is an adaptation of the 1965 novel Accident by Nicholas Mosley. It is the third of four Losey–Pinter collaborations; the others being The Servant (1963), Modesty Blaise (1966) and The Go-Between (1971). At the 1967 Cannes Film Festival, Accident won the Grand Prix Spécial du Jury award. It also won the Grand Prix of the Belgian Film Critics Association.

Plot
Stephen, a married Oxford tutor in his forties, has two students: the rich and likeable William, of whom he is fond, and a beautiful, enigmatic Austrian named Anna, whom he secretly covets. William also fancies Anna and hopes to know her better. While Stephen's wife is away having their third child, he looks up an old flame in London and they sleep together. Returning home, he finds that his pushy colleague Charley has been using the house for sex with Anna. She tells Stephen privately that she and William are engaged to be married.

William says that he will come to Stephen's house after a party that night. As he is too drunk to drive, Anna takes the wheel, but she crashes the car outside Stephen's gate. Upon finding the accident and William dead, Stephen pulls the deeply shaken Anna from the wreckage and hides her upstairs while he calls the police. Later, he forces himself on her while she is still in shock, then takes her back to her room at the university. He comes by in the morning to find a bemused Charley, who cannot prevent Anna from packing to return to Austria.

Cast
Dirk Bogarde as Stephen
Stanley Baker as Charley
Jacqueline Sassard as Anna
Michael York as William
Vivien Merchant as Rosalind, Stephen's wife
Alexander Knox as University Provost
Delphine Seyrig as Francesca, daughter of the provost
Ann Firbank as Laura
Brian Phelan as Police Sergeant
Terence Rigby as Plainclothes policeman
Freddie Jones as Man in Bell's office
Maxwell Findlater (pseudonym of Maxwell Caulfield) as Ted
Carole Caplin as Clarissa
Harold Pinter as Bell
Nicholas Mosley as Hedges
Steven Easton as Baby, Stephen and Rosalind's baby

Reception
Responding to criticism that the film's meaning was difficult to discern, Stanley Baker said: "It's obvious what Accident meant ... It meant what was shown on the screen." Of Joseph Losey's direction, Baker said: "One of Joe's problems is that he tends to wrap things up too much for himself. I think that 75% of the audience didn't realise that Accident was a flashback."

In his review upon the film's release, New York Times critic Bosley Crowther called Accident "a sad little story of a wistful don ... neither strong drama nor stinging satire."

The film performed poorly at the box office. In 1973, Losey said the film was "officially in bankruptcy."

On Rotten Tomatoes, Accident holds a rating of 78% from 27 reviews.

References
Notes

Further reading

Billington, Michael (2007) Harold Pinter.  London: Faber and Faber,    (13)  
Billington, Michael (1996) The Life and Work of Harold Pinter. London: Faber and Faber,   (10)
Gale, Steven H. (2003) Sharp Cut: Harold Pinter's Screenplays and the Artistic Process,  Lexington, Kentucky: The UP of Kentucky,   (10)   (13)  
Gale, Steven H. (2001) The Films of Harold Pinter.  Albany: SUNY P

External links
.
"Films by Harold Pinter: Accident 1966" – At HaroldPinter.org: The Official Website of the International Playwright Harold Pinter.
"Harold Pinter & Joseph Losey", by Jamie Andrews, Harold Pinter Archive Blog, British Library, 15 June 2009.
Accident at BFI Screenonline

1967 films
1967 drama films
Adultery in films
British drama films
Films about educators
Films based on British novels
Films directed by Joseph Losey
Films set in Oxford
Films with screenplays by Harold Pinter
Films set in universities and colleges
Films scored by John Dankworth
Cannes Grand Prix winners
1960s English-language films
1960s British films